Ocoee is a city in Orange County, Florida, United States. According to the 2019 US Census population estimate, the city had a population of 48,263. It is part of the Orlando–Kissimmee–Sanford, Florida Metropolitan Statistical Area.

History

Founding and early history
In the mid-1850s, Dr. J.D. Starke, stricken with malaria, took a group of slaves, similarly stricken, to the north side of an open pine wooded lake that provided clear and clean water to avoid further malaria outbreaks. The camp built by the group provided a base of operations from which to commute during the day to work the fields near Lake Apopka and rest at night. As the camp grew into a village, it took the name Starke Lake, a name the lake upon which the group settled bears to this day. The city's population increased further after the American Civil War as Confederate soldiers and their families settled into the area, including Captain Bluford Sims and General William Temple Withers who wintered at the location. Captain Sims received a land grant for a 74-acre parcel to the west of Starke Lake in what is now the downtown portion of Ocoee on October 5, 1883. In 1886, Captain Sims, along with a group of original settlers, led an effort to have the town platted and changed the name to Ocoee, after a river he grew up near in Tennessee.  Ocoee is a Cherokee Indian word anglicized from uwagahi, meaning "apricot vine place" and this inspired the choice of the city's flower.

Bluford Sims began groundbreaking work in budding wild orange trees while in Ocoee.  His commercial citrus nursery was the first in the United States in Ocoee, supplying many other groves in Florida with their first trees as well as shipping young citrus trees to California.  The construction of the Florida Midland Railroad in the 1880s spurred growth in the area and many more settlers moved in.

Ocoee massacre

On November 2, 1920, after July Perry and Mose Norman, two Black men, attempted to vote and encouraged other Black people to vote, the entire Black population of the town was attacked by a mob organized by the Ku Klux Klan. On the night of the massacre, white World War I veterans from throughout Orange County murdered dozens of African-American residents. At least 24 Black homes were burned, the institutions constituting the Black community were destroyed, and Perry was lynched. Before the massacre, Ocoee's Black population numbered approximately five hundred; after the massacre, however, the Black population was nearly eliminated. For more than 40 years, Ocoee remained an all-white sundown town. In 2018, the city commission issued a proclamation formally acknowledging the massacre and declaring that Ocoee is no longer a sundown town.

Incorporation and modern history
Ocoee was incorporated in 1922 (or 1923) and became a city in 1925.

Highway construction was the impetus for Ocoee's growth in the 20th century. State Road 50 (SR 50) was constructed south of downtown Ocoee in 1959 and provided a direct east-west connection between the City and a growing Orlando. The development of what would become Florida State Road 50 made the town more accessible to housing developers.  Florida's Turnpike was opened just south of downtown Ocoee in 1964.  In late 1990, Ocoee was connected to Orlando by a western extension of Florida State Road 408 (the East-West Expressway) which then joined the Florida's Turnpike south of SR 50.  In 2000, the completion of Florida State Road 429 (the Western Expressway) linked Ocoee with Walt Disney World to the south.

Geography

Demographics

As of the census of 2000, there were 24,391 people, 8,072 households, and 6,554 families residing in the city. The racial makeup of the city was 81.47% White, 6.59% African American, 0.35% Native American, 2.93% Asian, 0.06% Pacific Islander, 6.22% from other races, and 2.38% from two or more races. Hispanic or Latino of any race were 15.20% of the population.

There were 8,072 households, out of which 44.9% had children under the age of 18 living with them, 65.9% were married couples living together, 10.7% had a female householder with no husband present, and 18.8% were non-families. 13.2% of all households were made up of individuals, and 3.8% had someone living alone who was 65 years of age or older. The average household size was 2.99 and the average family size was 3.28.

In the city, the population was spread out, with 29.2% under the age of 18, 8.0% from 18 to 24, 36.2% from 25 to 44, 19.3% from 45 to 64, and 7.3% who were 65 years of age or older. The median age was 33 years. For every 100 females, there were 97.4 males. For every 100 females age 18 and over, there were 94.3 males.

The median income for a household in the city was $53,225, and the median income for a family was $56,865. Males had a median income of $33,628 versus $26,519 for females. The per capita income for the city was $20,896. About 4.2% of families and 5.6% of the population were below the poverty line, including 6.6% of those under age 18 and 8.1% of those age 65 or over.

As of the 2005-2009 American Community Survey the population was 31,544, and the city had a racial makeup of 74.9% White, 13.8% African American, 4.0% Asian, 0.2% Native American, 0.1% Pacific Islander, 5.4% some other race and 1.6% two or more races. Hispanic or Latino of any race was 16.6%.

Transportation
Ocoee was served by the Atlantic Coast Line Railroad. The Ocoee station burned in a fire of undetermined origin on December 4, 1928.
The Tavares and Gulf Railroad's terminus was in Ocoee.  Its former station still stands and is the home of the Ocoee Lions Club.

Education
Residents are zoned to Orange County Public Schools.

High schools serving sections of Ocoee include Ocoee High School, West Orange High School. and Olympia High School.

Notable people

 Brian Barber, former MLB player and amateur scouting director for the Philadelphia Phillies
 Bart Bryant, professional golfer
 Aubrey Perry, soccer player
 Grant Riller, professional basketball player

See also
 Ocoee Christian Church

References

Notes

External links
 City of Ocoee official website

 
Cities in Orange County, Florida
Greater Orlando
Cities in Florida
1850s establishments in Florida
Sundown towns in Florida